Levi Burnside "Lee" Casey (October 19, 1904 – April 1, 1983) was an American athlete who competed mainly in the triple jump. He was born in Vienna, Illinois.

He competed for the United States in the 1928 Summer Olympics held in Amsterdam, Netherlands in the Triple jump where he won the Silver medal.

External links 
 
 

Athletes (track and field) at the 1928 Summer Olympics
Olympic silver medalists for the United States in track and field
American male triple jumpers
1904 births
1983 deaths
Medalists at the 1928 Summer Olympics
People from Vienna, Illinois